Mubarak Sultan Faraj Al-Nubi (born 30 December 1977) is a retired Qatari athlete who specialized in the 400 metres hurdles. He is the brother of Olympic long jumper Abdul Rahman Al-Nubi. He represented his country at the 2000 Sydney Olympics and competed at the World Championships in Athletics in 1997 and 2003. He was twice a silver medallist at the IAAF World Cup.

At regional level, he won three gold medals in the 400 m hurdles at the Asian Athletics Championships and participated at three Asian Games, being the runner-up in 2002. In addition, he has medals from the Gulf Cooperation Council Athletics Championships and the Arab Athletics Championships. His personal best of 48.17 seconds is the Qatari record for the event.

International competitions

External links

References

1977 births
Living people
Qatari male hurdlers
Olympic athletes of Qatar
Athletes (track and field) at the 1996 Summer Olympics
Athletes (track and field) at the 2000 Summer Olympics
Asian Games medalists in athletics (track and field)
Athletes (track and field) at the 1998 Asian Games
Athletes (track and field) at the 2002 Asian Games
Athletes (track and field) at the 2006 Asian Games
Athletes (track and field) at the 2010 Asian Games
World Athletics Championships athletes for Qatar
Universiade medalists in athletics (track and field)
Asian Games silver medalists for Qatar
Medalists at the 2002 Asian Games
Universiade medalists for Qatar
Medalists at the 1997 Summer Universiade